Bátka (1895–1906:  and ) is a village and municipality in the Rimavská Sobota District of the Banská Bystrica Region of southern Slovakia.

History
The municipality arose in the late 19th century by a merge of Dolná Bátka (Alsóbátka) and Horná Bátka (Felsöbátka). The two villages formed one common village (Batka) before the mid-14th century, as well.

In historical records, Dolná Bátka was first mentioned in 1294 (Bathka). It belonged to the Kállay noble family in the 15th and 16th century. Horná Bátka arose in 1294 (as a part of Dolná Batka) as a royal donation to the knight Tumpold Krispin. In 1411 it passed to local landowners Bátky.From 1938 to 1944 it belonged to Hungary.

Genealogical resources

The records for genealogical research are available at the state archive "Statny Archiv in Banska Bystrica,Slovakia"

 Roman Catholic church records (births/marriages/deaths): 1789-1896 (parish B)
 Lutheran church records (births/marriages/deaths):1685-1897 (parish B)
 Reformated church records (births/marriages/deaths): 1786-1895 (parish A)

See also
 List of municipalities and towns in Slovakia

External links
https://web.archive.org/web/20071116010355/http://www.statistics.sk/mosmis/eng/run.html
https://web.archive.org/web/20070312194601/http://www.batka.ou.sk/
http://www.batka.gemer.org/
http://www.e-obce.sk/obec/batka/batka.html
Surnames of living people in Batka

Villages and municipalities in Rimavská Sobota District
Hungarian communities in Slovakia